Captain Ron is a 1992 American comedy film directed by Thom Eberhardt, produced by David Permut, and written by John Dwyer for Touchstone Pictures. It stars Kurt Russell as an eponymous sailor with a quirky personality and a checkered past, and Martin Short as an upper-middle class, suburban family man who hires him to sail a yacht through the Caribbean with him and his family aboard. Mary Kay Place, Meadow Sisto and Benjamin Salisbury also star as his wife and children.

Plot
Martin Harvey is a middle-aged office worker who lives in  Chicago with his wife, Katherine, 16-year-old daughter, Caroline, and 11-year-old son, Ben. When he learns his recently deceased uncle has bequeathed him a 60-foot yacht once owned by Clark Gable, he decides to take his family to the island of St. Pomme de Terre ("Saint Potato") to retrieve it so he can sell it. Katherine resists the idea, but agrees after Caroline announces she has just become engaged.

When the Harveys arrive at the island, they discover that the yacht, Wanderer, is in terrible condition. Upon hearing this, the yacht broker cancels his plan to send an experienced captain to help them sail it to Miami, and instead hires a local sailor, Captain Ron Rico, a one-eyed man with a very laid back attitude, and Navy veteran who claims to have piloted USS Saratoga. He launches immediately when he sees the car he arrived in roll off the dock and sink. Its owner arrives at the dock and shoots at him.

Captain Ron takes Ben's money in a game of Monopoly, giving him beer to drink and charging him for it later, but shows loyalty to Martin, who he refers to as "Boss". Martin, who doesn't like him, calls him "Moron" in his diary, and believes that he doesn't know what he's doing.

The Harveys decide to stop off in the Caribbean, but learn that Captain Ron doesn't know how to navigate. While on a random island, Martin decides to go on a nature hike, but runs into guerrillas led by General Armando. Captain Ron bargains for Martin's freedom by giving them a lift to the next island, and receiving some firearms in return to fight off pirates. This angers Martin, as he declares there will be no firearms on his yacht and tosses them overboard, before realizing that without them, he is going to have to give the guerrillas a lift.

In the yacht's cabin, Katherine shows Martin the initials of Clark Gable and Carole Lombard marked on the bedpost. They are so excited that they share their feelings and have passionate sex.

When they arrive at their next destination, at a non-USA "San Juan", Martin and Katherine are arrested for smuggling the guerrillas. Caroline and Ben party with the locals and Captain Ron, which ends with Caroline getting a tattoo, Ben breaking his glasses, and Captain Ron losing his glass eye. Martin and Katherine are released from jail, but forced to leave that night. Martin decides to leave Captain Ron behind and they encounter pirates who steal the yacht, and are stuck floating in a raft.

They land in Cuba and discover the yacht there. The pirates find them, but with the help of Captain Ron, they are able to escape with the yacht. Captain Ron learns that they underrate Martin, and he decides to play hurt, forcing Martin to take control of the escape. Using the skills that Captain Ron taught them, they are able to get the sails up after the engine breaks from lack of oil to distance themselves from the pirates. The United States Coast Guard, responding to a distress call from Ron, arrives and stops the pirates, creating a safe passage to Miami.

They arrive in Miami and part ways with Captain Ron. As they sail to their destination, they decide to turn the yacht around and keep it. In the final scene, Captain Ron appears to have cleaned up his appearance and has quickly taken on a new role as a captain for a wealthy couple and their small motorboat. Notably he is no longer wearing an eye patch.

Cast 

 Kurt Russell as Captain Ron Rico
 Martin Short as Martin Harvey
 Mary Kay Place as Katherine Harvey
 Meadow Sisto as Caroline Harvey
 Benjamin Salisbury as Ben Harvey
 Sunshine Logroño as General Armando (as Emannuel Logrono)
 Jorge Luis Ramos as General Armando's Translator
 J.A. Preston as Magistrate
 Tanya Soler as Angeline
 Raúl Estela as Roscoe
 Jainardo Batista as Mamba
 Dan Butler as Bill Zachery
 Tom McGowan as Bill
 Roselyn Sanchez as Clarisse
 Paul Anka as Donaldson, Yacht Broker
 Shanti Kahn as Patti, Donaldson's Secretary
 Katherine Calzada as Barbara 
 John Scott Clough as Garth
 Marty Eli Schwartz as Supervisor
 Craig Rondell as Caroline's Fiance
 C.M. Talkington (credited as Clement Talkington) as the Bicycle Messenger

Reception

Box office
The film grossed $22.5 million, against its budget of $24 million.

Critical response
The film premiered on September 18, 1992 to negative reviews from critics. It was panned for putting Russell in the comedic role and Short in the serious one, while others felt that Russell's fun performance as the irresponsible and sometimes unsympathetic yacht captain carried it through its flaws. It has a score of 26% on Rotten Tomatoes based on 23 reviews with an average rating of 4.3 out of 10. It has long, however, found a niche among sailors, and given the dearth of nautical comedies, had a resurgence of interest in the film during the mid-2010s.

Salisbury and Sisto were each nominated for a Young Artist Award.

References

External links

1992 films
1992 comedy films
1990s American films
1990s English-language films
American comedy films
Films directed by Thom Eberhardt
Films scored by Nicholas Pike
Films set in the Caribbean
Films set in Chicago
Films set in Cuba
Films set in Miami
Films set in Puerto Rico
Films shot in Chicago
Sailing films
Touchstone Pictures films